Eastabuchie is a census-designated place and unincorporated community in southwestern Jones County, Mississippi.  It is located along U.S. Route 11, just north of the Forrest County line. the community has a post office with the ZIP code 39436. Eastabuchie is part of the Laurel Micropolitan Statistical Area.

History
The name Eastabuchie is derived from a native Choctaw language term for the Leaf River.

Eastabuchie is located on the Norfolk Southern Railway and was incorporated on February 19, 1890. It was unincorporated at an unknown date.

It was first named as a CDP in the 2020 Census which listed a population of 187.
The small, rural town is home to the studios of television station WDAM, the area's NBC and ABC affiliate.

In 1912, according to Frank Leslie's Weekly, several Confederate veterans lost their lives in a train wreck in Eastabuchie.

Demographics

2020 census

Note: the US Census treats Hispanic/Latino as an ethnic category. This table excludes Latinos from the racial categories and assigns them to a separate category. Hispanics/Latinos can be of any race.

Education
Public education in the Jones County section of Eastabuchie is provided by the Jones County School District. Campuses serving the community include Moselle Elementary School (Grades K-6) and South Jones High School  (Grades 7-12).

In Forrest County portions, it is served by the Petal School District.

Notable people
 John R. Baylis, chemist and sanitary engineer
 Noah Webster Overstreet, architect

References

External links

Unincorporated communities in Jones County, Mississippi
Unincorporated communities in Mississippi
Laurel micropolitan area
Census-designated places in Forrest County, Mississippi
Census-designated places in Jones County, Mississippi
Mississippi placenames of Native American origin